Kihnu Veeteed ("Kihnu Waterways") is a ferry company which operates six routes in Estonia. It is registered on the island of Kihnu in the Gulf of Riga, and runs a fleet of passenger ferries.

The company's ferries provide connections between the mainland and the small islands of Kihnu, Manilaid, Vormsi, and Piirissaar. There is also a connection between the country's two largest islands, Saaremaa and Hiiumaa.

The ferry lines are operated on the basis of public procurement contracts, and most of the company's vessels are owned by the Estonian state, and specially built for these routes. In addition,  the Kihnu Maritime Fleet also owns two passenger ferries, "Amalie" and "Reet", which are used as back-up vessels. The company's newest vessel is "Soela", which like its sister ships "Ormsö" and "Kihnu Virve" was built by Baltic Workboats in Nasva, Estonia. Soela entered service between Sõru and Triigi in 2017, and can accommodate up to 200 passengers and 22 cars.

In 2019, Kihnu Veeteed took part in negotiations with Saaremaa Municipality to provide a ferry service between Mõntu on Saaremaa and Ventspils in Latvia but it was decided the company did not have the right ships to offer the service.

In July 2020 the Estonian Transport Administration signed a new contract with Kihnu Veeteed to provide services on its existing routes from 2021. The shipping companies TS Laevad and Tuule Liinid had also tendered to operate the routes.

See also
TS Laevad

References

Ferry companies of Estonia